Potok-Stany  is a village in the administrative district of Gmina Potok Wielki, within Janów Lubelski County, Lublin Voivodeship, in eastern Poland.

References

Potok-Stany